Gold Creek rises in Brisbane Forest Park in the suburb of Upper Brookfield, Brisbane, Queensland, Australia; is dammed by Gold Creek Dam and on leaving the Forest Park runs alongside Gold Creek Road until it joins Gap Creek at Brookfield.

References

External links

Geography of Brisbane
Rivers of Brisbane